The Hohenburg, also called Homburg Castle or Fortress Hohenburg, is a ruined castle located Homburg in the Saarpfalz district in Saarland, Germany. It stands atop the -high Schlossberg above the Schlossberg Caves (Schlossberghöhlen).

In the 12th century the castle was the seat of the counts of Homburg. In 1330 the received city rights (Stadtrechte) for their village at the foot of Schlossberg from the Emperor Ludwig the Bavarian. After the death of the last Count of Homburg in 1449 castle and city fell to the counts of Nassau-Saarbrücken. They rebuilt the castle in the second half of the 16th century into a renaissance palace, and then to a fortress.

In the 1600s King Louis XIV of France and his master builder Sébastien Le Prestre de Vauban expanded the fort and fortified the city. The basic structure of Homburg's old town dates back to this time. The fortifications were first demolished in 1697, and finally in 1714 when they served as a quarry for the construction of Karlsberg Castle. From 1981 the ruins were excavated and partially restored.

Publications

External links

 
 

Buildings and structures in Saarpfalz-Kreis
Ruined castles in Germany
Demolished buildings and structures in Germany